In historical times, Greek civilization has played one of the major roles in the history and development of Greek mathematics. To this day, a number of Greek mathematicians are considered for their innovations and influence on mathematics.

Ancient Greek mathematicians

Anaxagoras
Anthemius of Tralles
Antiphon
Apollonius of Perga
Archimedes
Archytas
Aristaeus the Elder
Aristarchus of Samos
Aristotle
Asclepius of Tralles
Attalus of Rhodes
Autolycus of Pitane
Bion of Abdera
Bryson of Heraclea
Callippus
Carpus of Antioch
Chrysippus
Cleomedes
Conon of Samos
Ctesibius
Democritus
Dicaearchus
Dinostratus
Diocles
Dionysodorus
Diophantus
Domninus of Larissa
Eratosthenes
Euclid
Eudoxus of Cnidus
Eutocius of Ascalon
Geminus
Heliodorus of Larissa
Hero of Alexandria
Hipparchus
Hippasus
Hippias
Hippocrates of Chios
Hypatia
Hypsicles
Leodamas of Thasos
Marinus of Neapolis
Menaechmus
Menelaus of Alexandria
Meton of Athens
Metrodorus
Nicomachus
Nicomedes
Nicoteles of Cyrene
Oenopides
Pappus of Alexandria
Perseus (geometer)
Philolaus
Philon
Philonides of Laodicea
Polyaenus of Lampsacus
Posidonius
Proclus
Ptolemy
Pythagoras
Serenus of Antinouplis
Simplicius of Cilicia
Sporus of Nicaea
Thales
Theaetetus
Theano
Theodorus of Cyrene
Theodosius of Bithynia
Theon of Alexandria
Theon of Smyrna
Theudius
Thrasyllus of Mendes
Thymaridas
Xenocrates
Zeno of Elea
Zenodorus

Byzantine mathematicians

Stephanus of Alexandria
Maximus Planudes
Isaac Argyros
Isidore of Miletus
John Philoponus
Anthemius of Tralles

Modern Greek mathematicians
Leonidas Alaoglu (1914–1981) - Known for Banach- Alaoglu theorem.
Charalambos D. Aliprantis (1946–2009) - Founder and Editor-in-Chief of the journals Economic Theory as well as Annals of Finance. 
Roger Apéry (1916–1994) - Professor of mathematics and mechanics at the University of Caen Proved the irrationality of zeta(3).
Tom M. Apostol (1923–2016) - Professor of mathematics in California Institute of Technology, he has authored a number of books about mathematics.
Dimitri Bertsekas (born 1942) - Member of the National Academy of Engineering professor with the Department of Electrical Engineering and Computer Science. Author of fifteen books and research monographs, and coauthor of an introductory probability textbook
Giovanni Carandino (1784–1834)
Constantin Carathéodory (1873–1950) - Mathematician who pioneered the Axiomatic Formulation of Thermodynamics.
Demetrios Christodoulou (born 1951) - Mathematician-physicist who has contributed in the field of general relativity.
Constantine Dafermos (born 1941) - Usually notable for hyperbolic conservation laws and control theory.
Mihalis Dafermos (born 1976) - Professor of Mathematics at Princeton University and Lowndean Chair of Astronomy and Geometry at the University of Cambridge
Apostolos Doxiadis (born 1953) - Australian born Mathematician.
Athanassios S. Fokas (born 1952) - Contributor in the field of integrable nonlinear partial differential equations.
Michael Katehakis (born 1952) - Professor at Rutgers University.
Alexander S. Kechris (born 1946) - Made notable contribution for the theory of Borel equivalence relations.
Nicholas Metropolis (1915–1999) - American born Greek physicist.
Yiannis N. Moschovakis (1938) - Writer, also worked as theorist in University of California, Los Angeles.
Christos Papakyriakopoulos (1914–1976) - Often called Papa, he specialized in geometric topology.
Athanasios Papoulis (1921–2002) - Contributed a number of theories, such as Papoulis–Gerchberg algorithm, A eloquent proof, among others.
Themistocles M. Rassias (born 1951) - Professor at the National Technical University of Athens.
Raphaël Salem (1898–1963) - Greek mathematician after whom are named the Salem numbers and whose widow founded the Salem Prize.
Cyparissos Stephanos (1857–1917) - Notable contributor of desmic systems.
Katia Sycara - Professor in the Carnegie Mellon School of Computer Science's Robotics Institute and the director of the Laboratory for Agents technology and Semantic web technologies.
Nicholas Varopoulos (born 1940) - Notable for his analysis on Lie groups.
Stathis Zachos (born 1947) - Published a number of writings on computer science.
Mihail Zervos - Working in Department of Mathematics, London School of Economics.

References

Greek